The 2014 Euroleague Final Four was the concluding EuroLeague Final Four tournament of the 2013–14 Euroleague basketball season. It was held from 16–18 May 2014. All of the games were played at the Mediolanum Forum, in Milan.  Maccabi Electra Tel Aviv upset CSKA Moscow, 68–67, in the first semifinal, while Real Madrid dominated FC Barcelona, 100–62, in the second semifinal.  In the final, Maccabi upset highly favored Real, by a score of 98–86, in the tournament's first overtime final since 1969.  The win gave Maccabi their sixth EuroLeague title.

Bracket

Semifinals
All times are CEST (UTC+2).

CSKA Moscow vs. Maccabi Electra Tel Aviv
CSKA Moscow entered their semi-final match up against Maccabi Electra Tel Aviv, having won both regular season meetings.  It looked like Moscow would make it 3–0 on the year, when they took a 55–40 lead, late in the third quarter.  However, led by guard Tyrese Rice, and support from a large majority of the fans in attendance, Maccabi launch a fourth quarter comeback.  Rice's steal and layup, with 5 seconds to play, gave Maccabi a 68–67 lead, and Sonny Weems missed a contested three pointer at the buzzer. Maccabi's David Blu led all scorers with 15 points.

FC Barcelona vs. Real Madrid
Real Madrid entered the Final Four as the clear favorite, having recorded the highest point differential in both group (plus 237) and Final 16 play (plus 143).  Between the two stages, they held a 24–4 overall record.

After FC Barcelona got off to a 12–4 start, the semifinal game was all Real Madrid.  Real scored 14 3-pointers, and played at a blistering pace, to beat their Spanish rivals for the fifth time in six games on the year. Real's Sergio Rodríguez led all-scorers with 21 points, followed by teammate Nikola Mirotić, who scored 19. Three other Real players scored more than 10 points.

Third-place game
Juan Carlos Navarro of FC Barcelona, became the EuroLeague's all-time leader in three-point field goals made, after hitting three three-point field goals during the game.

Championship game
Before the game, Real Madrid was heavily favored, as they sought a league-record ninth title.  Real got off to a good start, taking an 11-point lead in the first half, behind a 19–2 run.  However, Maccabi Tel Aviv fought back with a series of fast breaks, and trailed by just two points, at half time.

It looked as if Maccabi would come out on top, after a back-and-forth second half, that gave them a four-point lead, with under a minute to play.  However, Real hit four consecutive free throws, from Sergio Rodríguez and Ioannis Bourousis, to tie the game. Tyrese Rice missed a three pointer at the buzzer, that would have given Maccabi the win.  Instead, the final went to overtime, for the first time since 1969.  Rice dominated in overtime, scoring 14, as Maccabi pulled away, for a 98–86 win.  In total, Rice scored 21 of his 26 points in the fourth quarter and overtime.  Rodriguez led Real with 21 points.

The win gave Maccabi their sixth league title.  For Real Madrid, it was the second consecutive year in which they lost in the final game.

Reaction
Maccabi's surprise win led to wild celebrations, as the club's fans filled Tel Aviv's Rabin Square. Israeli President Shimon Peres, called to congratulate the team, saying "I watched the whole game, and nearly had a heart attack. You are heroes, and have brought incredible pride to the state of Israel."  Prime Minister Benjamin Netanyahu, also offered his personal congratulations.

Spanish fans expressed their frustration on Twitter. An estimated 18,000 such tweets contained anti-Semitic language, prompting a lawsuit by local Jewish communities, and an official apology by the league.

References

External links
Official Site

Final Four
2013-14
2013–14 in Israeli basketball
2013–14 in Russian basketball
2013–14 in Spanish basketball
2013–14 in Italian basketball
International basketball competitions hosted by Italy
Sports competitions in Milan